Across My Heart is the twenty-second studio album by country superstar Kenny Rogers.

Overview
The album was produced by Magnatone Records, and features a wide array of superstar talent collaborating with Rogers on various songs on the album. The album did hit the charts, with its strongest showing on the country charts at number 26, but it did not produce any singles.

Artists included in collaborations on the album include All-4-One, The Katinas, Tareva Henderson and Bekka & Billy.

Allmusic's Stephen Thomas Erlewine rated it 2.5 out of 5 stars, saying that " Even with all these collaborators, the album sounds homogenous, especially since the material is entirely generic. However, it holds together better than most Rogers albums since the mid-'80s, because it is evident that some thought and care went into its production."

Track listing

Personnel
 Kenny Rogers – acoustic guitar, lead vocals
 Jerry Kimbrough – acoustic guitar, electric guitar
 Brent Rowan – acoustic guitar, electric guitar
 Biff Watson – acoustic guitar, electric guitar
 Steve Glassmeyer – keyboards, Hammond organ, backing vocals
 Warren Hartman – keyboards
 Randy McCormick – keyboards, Hammond organ, acoustic piano
 Bobby Ogdin – keyboards, Hammond organ, acoustic piano, electric piano
 Gene Sisk – keyboards, backing vocals
 Duncan Mullins – bass guitar
 Willie Weeks – bass guitar
 Eddie Bayers – drums
 Paul Leim – drums, congas, percussion, tambourine
 Tom Roady – percussion
 Jim Horn – soprano saxophone
 Kim Carnes – backing vocals
 Robert Bailey Jr. – backing vocals
 Kim Fleming – backing vocals
 Vicki Hampton – backing vocals
 Cindy Walker – backing vocals
 Bergen White – backing vocals

Chart performance

References

Kenny Rogers albums
1997 albums
Albums produced by Brent Maher